Anarchy is the debut studio album by British singer and songwriter Neon Hitch. It was released on 22 July 2016, by her own record label, #WeRNeon.

The album was preceded by the lead single "Please", which was released as an instant grat along with the album pre-order on 8 July. The song was featured in an episode of Million Dollar Matchmaker along with Neon herself.

Anarchy was released in 2016, Eleutheromaniac, the unreleased 2014 album which was first announced after Hitch's split from Warner Bros. in 2014. It was supposed to include the singles on the  album, "Yard Sale", "Eleutheromaniac", "Sparks", which are stand alone singles, from the unreleased album, "Anarchy" In 2016, was released instead, It officially Serves as her Debut.

The album was released on 22 July 2016 and was met with critical acclaim from fans and blogs who praised Hitch's new sound and evolution since her early releases during her Warner Bros. days. The album includes a bonus track called "Freedom", which was released as a stand-alone single on 18 December along with a remix EP on iTunes.

The album was only released as a digital album until 2021 when it was released on a limited edition vinyl run of 301 copies.

Background 
On 11 May 2014, during a live chat, Hitch announced that after almost four years she had parted ways with Warner Bros. She also confirmed that her Beg, Borrow & Steal album was scrapped, and she would be releasing a new album titled Eleutheromaniac. She also announced that her mixtapes, Happy Neon and 301 to Paradise, would also be released to digital retailers on 20 May 2014. Throughout May 2014 and January 2015, Hitch released the singles "Yard Sale" and "Sparks", in order to promote the further release of Eleutheromaniac. On 1 March 2014 Hitch surprise-released the extended play 24:00, which, according to her, was recorded in 24 hours. On 22 April 2015, the title track, "Eleutheromaniac", was sent to digital retailers as an advancement of the album. Later, on 21 August, Hitch released both explicit and clean versions of the song "Pussy Power" on iTunes. Hitch was featured on Cash Cash's song "Devil", also featuring B.o.B and Busta Rhymes.

In May 2016 Hitch announced that her debut studio album would be titled Anarchy and its official release date is 22 July 2016. Hitch released the song "Please" as the lead single along with the pre-order of Anarchy, on 8 July 2016. Hitch released the album's track listing on 8 July 2016 through Twitter. In August 2016 Hitch made an appearance on the reality television series Million Dollar Matchmaker.

Track listing

References 

2016 debut albums
Neon Hitch albums
Self-released albums